Britta Oppelt (born 5 July 1978) is a German Olympic-medal winning sculler.

Oppelt was born in East Berlin, and competed in the 2004 Summer Olympics in Athens, Greece, in the double sculls, and took home the silver medal along with teammate Peggy Waleska.

At the 2012 Summer Olympics, she was on the German quadruple sculls team that won the silver medal, along with Annekatrin Thiele, Carina Bär and Julia Richter.

In 2008, she was part of the German quadruple sculls team that won the bronze medal at the Beijing Olympics, along with Manuela Lutze, Kathrin Boron and Stephanie Schiller.

She is also a two-time world champion in the women's quadruple sculls in 2011 and 2013.  In 2011, she rowed with Tina Manker, Stephanie Schiller and Julia Richter.  In 2013, she rowed with Carina Bär, Julia Richter and Annekatrin Thiele.  In the quadruple sculls, she has also won two world championship silver medals, in 2005 (with Susanne Schmidt, Kathrin Boron and Stephanie Schiller) and 2007 (with Manuela Lutze, Kathrin Boron and Stephanie Schiller), and a bronze in 2010 (with Carina Bär, Tina Manker and Julia Richter).  She has also won two silvers medals at world level in the double sculls, in 2003 (with Kathrin Boron) and 2006 (with Susanne Schmidt).

At European level she has won quadruple sculls gold at the 2013 European Championships and silver at the 2010 European Championships.

References

External links
 Official website 
 
 
 

1978 births
Living people
German female rowers
Rowers from Berlin
Olympic rowers of Germany
Rowers at the 2004 Summer Olympics
Rowers at the 2008 Summer Olympics
Rowers at the 2012 Summer Olympics
Olympic silver medalists for Germany
Olympic bronze medalists for Germany
Olympic medalists in rowing
Medalists at the 2012 Summer Olympics
Medalists at the 2008 Summer Olympics
Medalists at the 2004 Summer Olympics
World Rowing Championships medalists for Germany
20th-century German women
21st-century German women